Jürgen Seydel (September 12, 1917 – August 3, 2008) was the father of karate in Germany according to the views of some people.

In 1939 Seydel began judo training at the University of Bonn. In 1955, he read an article in a French magazine about karate, which was still unknown in Germany at the time; he traveled to Paris to learn this art. In 1957 Seydel founded according to the JKA the first karate club in Germany in Bad Homburg and soon opened a studio in Usingen.  Jürgen learnt from a textbook by Henry Plée and with the knowledge he had acquired on courses. In 1959 he passed the exam for the 1st Dan. Until 1965 he was the only Dan carrier in Germany. Seydel's most prominent student was U.S. musician Elvis Presley, then stationed in Germany during his military service.

Jürgen Seydel was awarded the Order of Merit of the Federal Republic of Germany by Federal President Richard von Weizsäcker for his services to karate in Germany.

Literature

Werner Lind: Lexikon der Kampfkünste. China, Japan, Okinawa, Korea, Vietnam, Thailand, Burma, Indonesien, Indien, Mongolei, Philippinen, Taiwan u. a. Sportverlag, Berlin 1999, (Edition BSK).

References

1917 births
2008 deaths
German male karateka
Karate coaches
Recipients of the Cross of the Order of Merit of the Federal Republic of Germany
Shotokan practitioners
Sportspeople from Bonn
University of Bonn alumni
20th-century German people